Emil Pierre Mailho (December 16, 1908 – March 7, 2007) was a professional baseball player. He played part of one season in Major League Baseball in 1936 for the Philadelphia Athletics. He was born in Berkeley, California, and died in Castro Valley, California. Between mid-1931 and 1936, Mailho played for the Oakland Oaks in the Pacific Coast League, hitting over .300 each year, except for an injury shortened 1934 season.

When called up by the Athletics, Mailho was mostly used as a left-handed pinch hitter by manager Connie Mack, although he appeared in one game as an outfielder.

After his stint with the Athletics, Mailho joined the Atlanta Crackers of the Southern Association for the rest of the 1936 season, hitting .315. Between 1937 and 1941, Mailho never hit below .298 in a season. Mailho returned to the Pacific Coast League, playing for the Oakland Oaks in 1942 to 1944, and the San Francisco Seals in 1945. Mailho ended his professional career with the Oklahoma City Indians of the Texas League in 1946, playing 55 games and hitting .226.

At the time of his death, at 98, Mailho was recognized as the fourth-oldest living former major league ballplayer.

References

External links

Major League Baseball outfielders
Philadelphia Athletics players
Phoenix Senators players
Oakland Oaks (baseball) players
Atlanta Crackers players
San Francisco Seals (baseball) players
Oklahoma City Indians players
Baseball players from California
1908 births
2007 deaths